Hosoe may refer to:

Hosoe, Shizuoka, a former town in Shizuoka Prefecture, Japan

People with the surname
, Japanese photographer
, Japanese video game composer

Japanese-language surnames